Arpád Györi (born 26 September 1970) is a Slovak former professional ice hockey right winger. He is currently the head coach of HC Tábor of the Czech 2.liga.

Györi played in the Czech Extraliga for HC České Budějovice and HC Železárny Třinec from 1993 to 1998 He also played in the Tipsport Liga for HC Košice and HK Dukla Trenčín before spending three seasons playing in Germany for EHC Wolfsburg in the Oberliga and the 2nd Bundesliga.

During the 2002–03 season, Györi joined HC Tábor of the Czech 2.liga and remained a player there until his retirement in 2008. He later became assistant coach for the team and became head coach in 2018.

References

External links

1970 births
Living people
Motor České Budějovice players
Slovak ice hockey coaches
Slovak ice hockey right wingers
HK Dukla Trenčín players
Grizzlys Wolfsburg players
HC Košice players
HC Oceláři Třinec players
HK Poprad players
HC Tábor players
Hungarians in Slovakia
People from Trebišov District
Sportspeople from the Košice Region
Czechoslovak ice hockey right wingers
Slovak expatriate ice hockey players in the Czech Republic
Slovak expatriate ice hockey players in Germany